Toni Gonzaga-Soriano is a Filipina actress, singer and TV presenter. In 1998, she was cast in the longest-running Philippine comedy sketch gags show, Bubble Gang. Her biggest break in the entertainment television industry was her Sprite TV commercial with Piolo Pascual in 2001. In 2002, she was one of the hosts of longest-running noontime variety show Eat Bulaga. In the same year, she was cast in the primetime television series Habang Kapiling Ka starring Angelika dela Cruz. In March 2004, she joined Studio 23's Wazzup Wazzup with Archie Alemania and Vhong Navarro.

After she transferred to ABS-CBN in 2005, Gonzaga became the lead host of the Pinoy Big Brother reality series franchise, and one of the co-hosts on the longest-running Sunday musical variety program ASAP. In the same year, she starred as one of the main leads in her first comedy-horror film D' Anothers and in her first primetime television series Crazy For You co-starring Luis Manzano as her love interest. In 2013, Gonzaga hosted the singing reality show, The Voice of the Philippines. She then starred as Teddie in the popular film Four Sisters and a Wedding, and portrayed the role of Ginny in the film Starting Over Again, which was an instant box office hit. In 2014, Gonzaga played the lead character Julie in the ABS-CBN sitcom series Home Sweetie Home, which lasted until its cancellation in 2020. After hosting a political event in February 2022, she quit hosting Pinoy Big Brother after 16 years and confirmed her departure from ABS-CBN.

In September 2022, Gonzaga and her husband Paul Soriano transferred to AMBS (ALLTV). Gonzaga made an exclusive interview with President Bongbong Marcos inside Malacañang Palace. A weekday afternoon talk show called Toni, hosted and produced by herself, premiered on ALLTV on October 3, 2022.

Films

Television

References

Philippine filmographies
Actress filmographies